The Arctic Winter Games Arena is a 2,500-seat multi-purpose arena in Iqaluit, Nunavut, Canada. It opened to the public in October 2001. This arena was initially built to house the hockey and speed skating events of the 2002 Arctic Winter Games, but it is now used as a youth centre and to host large community events.

The venue hosted CBC Television's Hockey Day in Canada in 2003, and a White Stripes concert in 2007. The arena was also site to four professional wrestling events, featuring WWE superstars Christian and Gail Kim, as well as Tracy Brooks, Robert Roode and Rhino in 2008.

The surface of the arena had become unusable (for ice) after a portion the floor sank in 2006, however, on August 18, 2009, $2.2 million was allocated by the Government of Canada to repair the surface.

References

Indoor arenas in Nunavut
Indoor ice hockey venues in Canada
Buildings and structures in Iqaluit
Sport in the Arctic
Sports venues completed in 2001
2001 establishments in Nunavut